The 1994 Penn State Nittany Lions football team represented the Pennsylvania State University in the 1994 NCAA Division I-A football season. The team was coached by Joe Paterno and played its home games in Beaver Stadium in University Park, Pennsylvania.

The team was selected national champion by DeVold, Eck Ratings System, Matthews Grid Ratings, and The New York Times, while named co-champion by Rothman (FACT), National Championship Foundation, and Sagarin Ratings.

Schedule

Roster

Rankings

Game summaries

Minnesota

USC

Iowa

Rutgers

Temple

Michigan

Ohio State

Indiana

Illinois

Northwestern

Michigan State

Rose Bowl

Notes 
 Penn State sets a single season record for most points scored (564).

Players in the 1995 NFL Draft

References

Penn State
Penn State Nittany Lions football seasons
Big Ten Conference football champion seasons
Lambert-Meadowlands Trophy seasons
Rose Bowl champion seasons
College football undefeated seasons
Penn State Nittany Lions football